Tabernaemontana glabra is an evergreen tree from the family Apocynaceae, native to Mexico, Central America, and northwestern South America (Colombia, Peru, Ecuador, Bolivia). It is similar to Tabernaemontana donnell-smithii, except that its leaves and flowers are larger and its fruit is smaller.

References

glabra
Flora of Central America
Flora of South America
Plants described in 1845